The Samuel Wheat House is a historic house at 399 Waltham Street in Newton, Massachusetts.  It is a -story timber-frame house, five bays wide, with a gambrel roof and clapboard siding.  The front entrance is flanked by pilasters and topped by a gabled pediment.  The house was built c. 1735, probably for Dr. Samuel Wheat, Jr, and is one of the oldest houses in the city.  It was probably built with the gambrel roof, but the dormers are a 19th-century addition.

The house was listed on the National Register of Historic Places in 1986.

See also
 National Register of Historic Places listings in Newton, Massachusetts

References

Houses completed in 1735
Houses on the National Register of Historic Places in Newton, Massachusetts
Georgian architecture in Massachusetts